Danka may refer to:
 
A family affiliated with a Buddhist temple in Japan, or danka.

People with the given name
Danka Barteková (born 1984), Slovak skeet shooter
Danka Kovinić (born 1994), Montenegrin professional tennis player
Danka Podovac (born 1982), Serbian football player

People with the surname
Imre Danka (1930–2014), Hungarian footballer

See also

 Danke (disambiguation)
Donka (disambiguation)

Slavic feminine given names
Serbian feminine given names